The European and African Zone was one of the three zones of regional Davis Cup competition in 2005.

In the European and African Zone there were four different groups in which teams competed against each other to advance to the next group.

Participating teams

Draw 

Finland and Greece relegated to Group II in 2005.
Germany, Great Britain, Belgium, and Slovakia advance to World Group Play-off.

First round matches

Second round matches

Great Britain vs. Luxembourg

First round play-off matches

Second round play-off matches 

2004 Davis Cup Europe/Africa Zone
Davis Cup Europe/Africa Zone